= United Nations human rights organization =

United Nations human rights organization may refer to:

- Office of the United Nations High Commissioner for Human Rights, a department for promoting human rights at the United Nations Secretariat
- United Nations Human Rights Council, an organ tasked with the promotion of human rights at the United Nations
- United Nations Commission on Human Rights, a defunct functional commission from 1946 to 2006 at the UN Economic and Social Council
- United Nations Human Rights Committee, a treaty body established by the 1966 International Covenant on Civil and Political Rights
